Akiva was the Judean religious leader Rabbi Akiva (c. 50 – c. 135 CE).

Akiva also may refer to:
 Akiva (given name)
 Yeshivat Akiva, religious school
 Akiva, a planet in the Star Wars franchise

See also
 Akiba (disambiguation)